Lismore College may refer to:

 Lismore High School, New South Wales, Australia
 Trinity Catholic College, Lismore, New South Wales, Australia
 Lismore Seminary, Scotland, United Kingdom

See also
 Lismore